Slippery When Wet is a soundtrack album to Bruce Brown's 1959 surf film of the same name by saxophonist Bud Shank released on the World Pacific label.

Reception

AllMusic rated the album with 3 stars.

Track listing
All compositions by Bud Shank.
 "Mook's Theme" - 4:32
 "Surf Pipers" - 3:32
 "The Surf and I" - 3:06
 "Up in Velseyland" - 3:23
 "Surf for Two" - 3:39
 "Slippery When Wet" - 2:36
 "Going My Wave" - 3:10
 "Old King Nep's Tune" - 3:43
 "Walkin' on the Water" - 4:42
 "Soupsville" - 3:34

Personnel 
Bud Shank - alto saxophone, flute
Billy Bean - guitar
Gary Peacock - bass
Chuck Flores - drums

References 

1959 albums
World Pacific Records albums
Bud Shank albums